Laurent Grech was a French gymnast. He competed in the men's artistic individual all-around event at the 1920 Summer Olympics.

References

Year of birth missing
Year of death missing
French male artistic gymnasts
Olympic gymnasts of France
Gymnasts at the 1920 Summer Olympics
Place of birth missing